Filippovichi is the name of several rural localities in Russia:
Filippovichi, Bryansk Oblast, a selo in Filippovichsky Selsoviet of Trubchevsky District of Bryansk Oblast
Filippovichi, Leningrad Oblast, a village in Yam-Tesovskoye Settlement Municipal Formation of Luzhsky District of Leningrad Oblast
Filippovichi, Moscow Oblast, a village in Gololobovskoye Rural Settlement of Zaraysky District of Moscow Oblast